The Lady Evelyn River is a river in Nipissing, Sudbury and Timiskaming Districts, Ontario, Canada. 

The river begins at the confluence of the North and South Lady Evelyn Rivers and flows to its mouth at the Montreal River. It lies mostly in Lady Evelyn-Smoothwater Provincial Park, and mostly within Timiskaming District, with the exception of a short portion of the South Branch at its most southern stretch, which lies in northeastern Sudbury District, and of the southernmost tip of Lady Evelyn Lake, which lies in northwestern Nipissing District. Numerous waterfalls are found along the Lady Evelyn River, such as Frank's Falls.

See also
List of rivers of Ontario

References

Sources

Rivers of Sudbury District
Rivers of Nipissing District
Tributaries of the Ottawa River